Ellington Indigos is a 1958 jazz album by Duke Ellington.

The stereo CD reissue released by Columbia (CK 4444) in 1987 contains a track listing and cover art that is drastically different from the original mono LP. A change in song order and two "new" songs — "Night and Day" and "All The Things You Are" — were added to the CD while "The Sky Fell Down" was omitted.

LP (Columbia CL1085)
Side one
"Solitude" — 4:43  (Duke Ellington)  Soloist is Duke Ellington on piano.  Recorded on October 14, 1957.
"Where or When" — 4:02  (Richard Rodgers)  Soloist is Paul Gonsalves on tenor saxophone.  Recorded on October 10, 1957.
"Mood Indigo" — 3:07  (Duke Ellington/Barney Bigard)  Soloist is Shorty Baker on trumpet.  Recorded on September 9, 1957.
"Autumn Leaves" — 7:10  (Music: Joseph Kosma, Lyrics: Jacques Prévert/Johnny Mercer)  Vocalist is Ozzie Bailey.  Soloist is Ray Nance on violin.  Recorded on Oct 1, 1957.
Side two
"Prelude to a Kiss" — 4:44  (Duke Ellington)  Soloist is Johnny Hodges on alto saxophone.  Recorded on October 1, 1957.
"Willow Weep for Me" — 4:15  (Ann Ronell)   Soloist is Shorty Baker on trumpet.  Recorded on October 10, 1957.
"Tenderly" — 5:23  (Walter Gross)  Soloist is Jimmy Hamilton on clarinet.  Recorded on September 9, 1957.
"Dancing in the Dark" — 4:28  (Arthur Schwartz)  Soloist is Harry Carney on baritone saxophone.  Recorded on October 1, 1957.

CD (Columbia COL 4723642)
"Solitude"
"Where or When"
"Mood Indigo"
"Night and Day" — 2:54  (Cole Porter)  Soloist is Paul Gonsalves on tenor saxophone.  Recorded on October 10, 1957.
"Prelude to a Kiss"
"All the Things You Are" — 3:50  (Jerome Kern)  Soloist is Duke Ellington on piano.  Recorded on October 10, 1957.
"Willow Weep for Me"
"Tenderly"
"Dancing in the Dark"
"Autumn Leaves"
"The Sky Fell Down"

Different versions
The original mono (CL 1085) and stereo (CS 8053) LP issues contained some different takes between them on various tracks, "Willow Weep for Me" being one of them.

The CD (CBS 463342 2) liner notes say that "All The Things You Are and "Night and Day" were previously unreleased versions and that "Autumn Leaves" was an alternate take. Analyzing the two versions of "Autumn Leaves" shows that they are identical — but the LP has Ozzie Bailey's first vocal chorus (a French one) edited out. (There is indeed an alternate version of "Autumn Leaves" recorded September 9, 1957 available, on Duke Ellington & His Great Vocalists (Columbia CK 66372).) The stereo versions of "Mood Indigo" and "Willow Weep for Me" are different from their mono counterparts.

There are a multitude of versions of this album in circulation. For instance, there is another mono take of "Mood Indigo" available on the LP (CBS 88653 side 2, track 6).

Listing
LP: Columbia CL 1085 (mono — 9 tracks — original album)
LP: Columbia CS 8053 (stereo — 8 tracks — no "The Sky Fell Down")
LP: CBS 88653 (stereo — 8 tracks — no "The Sky Fell Down")
CD: Columbia CK 4444 (stereo — 10 tracks — no "The Sky Fell Down")
CD: CBS 463342 2 (stereo — 10 tracks — no "The Sky Fell Down")
CD: Columbia COL 4723642 (stereo — 11 tracks — French)

Personnel

Performance
Duke Ellington (piano)
Jimmy Woode (bass)
Sam Woodyard  (drums)
Paul Gonsalves (tenor saxophone)
Jimmy Hamilton, Russell Procope (clarinet, alto saxophone)
Harry Carney (baritone saxophone)
Johnny Hodges, Rick Henderson (alto saxophone)
John Sanders, (bass trombone)
Quentin Jackson, Britt Woodman (trombone)
Cat Anderson, Shorty Baker, Willie Cook, Clark Terry (trumpet)
Ray Nance (trumpet, violin)
Ozzie Bailey (vocal)

Credits
Irving Townsend (producer)
Stanley Dance (liner notes)
Allen Weinberg (artwork, cover design)
David Gahr (photography)
Michael Brooks (digital producer)
Larry Keyes (remixing)
Mike Berniker, Amy Herot (production & Jazz masterpieces series coordinators)

References

1958 albums
Duke Ellington albums
Columbia Records albums
Albums produced by Irving Townsend
CBS Records albums